The Gatard Statoplan AG 01 Statoplan Alouette was a light, two-seat sports airplane developed in France in the early 1950s and marketed for homebuilding.

Design
It was a high-wing cantilever monoplane of short-coupled design with fixed tailwheel undercarriage. Construction was a plywood-covered wooden structure throughout. The variable-incidence horizontal stabiliser was fitted with small endplates to provide extra directional stability but there were no separate elevators.

Specifications

References

Further reading
 

1950s French sport aircraft
Homebuilt aircraft
Gatard aircraft
Single-engined tractor aircraft
High-wing aircraft
Aircraft first flown in 1951